The Kresna–Razlog Uprising (Kresnensko-Razlozhko vastanie; , Kresnensko vоstanie, Kresna Uprising) named by the insurgents the Macedonian Uprising, was a Bulgarian uprising  against the Ottoman rule, predominantly in the areas of today Pirin Macedonia (now in Bulgaria) in late 1878 and early 1879. It broke out following the protests and spontaneous opposition to the decisions of the Congress of Berlin, which, instead of ceding the Bulgarian-populated parts of Macedonia to the newly reestablished Bulgarian suzerain state per the Treaty of San Stefano, returned them to Ottoman control. It was prepared by the Unity Committee. The rebellion was supported by detachments which had infiltrated the area from the Principality of Bulgaria.  As a result of disagreement within its leadership, the uprising lost its initial successful curse and was crushed by the Ottoman army.

The uprising is celebrated today in both Bulgaria and North Macedonia as part of their nations’ struggle against the Ottoman rule and thus it is still a divisive issue. In Bulgaria, it is considered as a rebellion prepared by part of the Bulgarians in the Ottoman Empire and the Unity Committee in Bulgaria itself. Its common goal was the unification of Bulgaria and Ottoman Macedonia. However, in North Macedonia it is assumed that the rebellion was carried out by two different peoples with diverse goals. Thus practically the Macedonians were striving for independence, while the Bulgarians were attempting to use the rebellion to realize their Greater Bulgarian chauvinist ideas. The post-WWII  Macedonian rendition of history has reappraised the uprising as an allegedly anti-Bulgarian revolt. Even though the Macedonian identity had its roots only among a small group at that time, and those Macedonians who had clear ethnic consciousness believed they were Bulgarians.

Prelude to the Uprising 
 
The revolutionary circles in Bulgaria concurred at once with the idea of inciting an uprising in Macedonia. On 29 August 1878, a meeting of representatives from the Bulgarian revolutionaries was convened in the town of Veliko Tarnovo in order to implement the plan. This meeting resulted in the creation of a committee called Edinstvo (Unity). The initiative for this belonged to Lyuben Karavelov, Stefan Stambolov and Hristo Ivanov. The task of this new committee was to establish similar committees throughout Bulgaria, to maintain strict contact with them, and work toward the same end: "unity of all the Bulgarians" and the improvement of their present political situation. 
 Soon after Edinstvo was formed in Tarnovo, steps were taken to spread it to all towns in Bulgaria, Eastern Rumelia  and to Russia and Romania as well. People were also sent to Macedonia to personally acquaint themselves with the situation there. Some were also sent to meet with Nathanael, the Ohrid bishop. He was to be told the aim and the task of Edinstvo. Meanwhile, Nathanael was already in the middle of preparations for armed activities in Macedonia. He made his way to Kyustendil to meet with the well-known haiduk leader, Ilyo Voyvoda and his rebels. At this meeting it was decided that Natanail should take over leadership of the hajduk bands. At the same time, Nathanael was able to establish an Edinstvo headquarters in the Kyustendil, one in Dupnitsa  and another in Gorna Dzhumaya. The concrete aims of the leaders and organizers of the Kresna–Razlog Uprising were to revoke the decisions of the Berlin Congress, to liberate the regions inhabited by the Bulgarian population, and to unite with the free Principality of Bulgaria. For these reasons Metropolitan Nathanael of Ohrid wrote to Petko Voyvoda:

In September 1878, the Rila Monastery hosted a critical meeting attended by Metropolitan Nathanael of Ohrid, Dimitar Pop Georgiev - Berovski, Ilyo Voyvoda, Mihail Sarafov, the voivode Stoyan Karastoilov and other high-ranking figures. The conference led to the formation of an organized insurrectional staff headed by Berovski. The Edinstvo ("Unity") Committee from Sofia aided the insurrectionists with two detachments, one led by the Russian Adam Kalmykov and the other by the Pole Luis Wojtkiewicz. The aim of "Edinstvo Committees"  was "...discussing how to help our brothers in Thrace and Macedonia, who will henceforth be separated from Danubian Bulgaria by virtue of the decisions of the Berlin Congress..." Stefan Stambolov and Nikola Obretenov suggested the appointment of "apostles" who would organize the uprising among the masses, but it was decided that only the areas closest to the Principality of Bulgaria would revolt, with a view to detaching them from the Ottoman Empire and joining them to Bulgaria.

Uprising 

Early at dawn on October 5, 1878, 400 insurgents attacked the Turkish army unit stationed at the Kresna Inns and after a battle lasting 18 hours they succeeded in crushing its resistance. This attack and this first success marked the beginning of the Kresna–Razlog Uprising. In the battles that followed, the insurgents succeeded in liberating 43 towns and villages and in reaching Belitsa and Gradeshnitsa to the south. To the south-west they established their sway over almost the entire Karshijak region, while to the south-east the positions of the insurgents were along the Predela, over the town of Razlog. In addition to the direct military operations of the insurgents, there were separate detachments operating in the south and to the west in Macedonia. There were also disturbances, and delegations were sent to the headquarters of the Uprising with requests for arms and for aid. The headquarters of the Uprising, which was organized in the course of the military operations, was headed by Dimiter Popgeorgiev. Elders’ Councils were also set up, as well as local police organs of the revolutionary government who were assigned certain administrative functions in the liberated territories. 

The Edinstvo Committee in the town of Gorna Dzhoumaya played an important part in organizing, supplying and assisting the Uprising. The committee was headed by Kostantin Bosilkov, who was born in the town of Koprivshtitsa and who had worked for many years as teacher in the Macedonia region. The main goal of the armed struggle though, was expressed most clearly in the letter of the Melnik rebels of December 11, 1878, which they sent to the chief of the Petrich police: "...We took up the arms and will not leave them until we get united with the Bulgarian Principality..." This aim was also expressed in the appeal launched by the insurgents on November 10, 1878, which read: "...And so, brothers, the time has come to demonstrate what we are, that we are a people worthy of liberty, and that the blood of Kroum and Simeon is still flowing in our veins; the time has come to demonstrate to Europe that it is no easy task when a people want to cast away darkness." During the military operations in the Kresna region, an uprising broke out on November 8, 1878, in the Bansko-Razlog valley. The detachment of volunteers from Moesia, led by Banyo Marinov, a revolutionary and volunteer from the Russo-Turkish War (1877–1878), played an important part in that uprising. It was promptly joined by scores of local insurgents and, after a fierce skirmish, it succeeded in liberating the town of Bansko. The setbacks in the autumn of 1878 led to a new organization of the leading body of the Uprising and to the adoption of new tactics. Efforts were now directed toward the setting up of a Central Committee which was to take over the leadership of the Uprising, as well as to organize an uprising in the interior of Macedonia in the spring of 1879. The detachment which crossed into Macedonia in May 1879 could not fulfill its task due to the lack of preliminary organization. These events marked the end of the Kresna–Razlog Uprising.

Significance and consequences 

In this manner the Kresna–Razlog Uprising was left without its expected and most reliable reserve – Russia's military, diplomatic and political support, in addition to its being against the interests of Austria-Hungary and Britain. Russia was exhausted both financially and militarily, adopting a firm course of adhering to the decisions of the Berlin Congress in relation to Macedonia. Her strategic aim lay in the preservation of the Bulgarian character of Eastern Roumelia. It encountered yet another strong adversary - the military and political machine of the Ottoman state. 

The representatives of the Provisional Russian Administration in Principality of Bulgaria, who sympathised with the struggle, were reprimanded by the Russian Emperor in person. These were the decisive reasons for its failure, parallel with reasons of internal and organizational character. Typical for the uprising was the scale participation of volunteers - Bulgarians of all parts of the country. Some figures as an illustration: 100 volunteers from Sofia, 27 from Tirnovo, 65 from Pazardzhik, 19 from Troyan, 31 from Pleven, 74 from Orhanye, 129 from the Plovdiv district, 17 from Provadia, 30 from Eastern Rumelia and others. A large number of insurgents and leaders of different parts of Macedonia also participated in the uprising. After the uprising some 30,000 refugees fled to Bulgaria. The failure of the uprising led to the attention of the Bulgarian political and strategic leaders to the liberation of the other parts of the Bulgarian territories and another main strategic objective - unification of the Principality of Bulgaria and Eastern Rumelia, the latter being under the Sultan's power, but still having a large autonomy. Macedonia and Thrace should have to wait.

Controversy 

Like most 19th century events and developments in the region of Macedonia, the issue on national and ethnic affiliations of the insurgents is contested in the Republic of North Macedonia. The uprising is regarded as ethnic Macedonian by the historians from North Macedonia. They support their perception of the existence of a Macedonian ethnicity at that time with a single document: the Proclamation of Kresna Uprising. However this document is considered а deception by the Bulgarian scientists. The Bulgarians pointed out the lack of a preserved original, the usage of anachronistic language and its content sharply contradicting with the rest of the other preserved documents. The Bulgarians argued about the existence of a kept original called "Temporary rules about the organisation of the Macedonian Uprising" prepared by Stefan Stambolov and Nathanael of Ohrid.

Macedonian historians argue also that the use of the word "Bulgarian" in Ottoman Macedonia does not refer to ethnicity, and that it had been synonymous with  "Christian" or "peasant". Bulgarian historians argue that the term "Macedonian"  has never been used in an "ethnic" but in a "regional" sense, similar to the regional term "Thracian" and note that no distinction between "Macedonian Bulgarians", "Bulgarians" and "Slavs" existed at that time pointing to the correspondence of the insurgents of the uprising with the Bulgarian committees "Edinstvo" - (Unity).

See also 
National awakening of Bulgaria
Razlovtsi insurrection
Liberation of Bulgaria
Bulgarian unification
Ilinden–Preobrazhenie Uprising
Tikveš uprising

Footnotes

Sources 
 Дойно Дойнов. Кресненско-Разложкото въстание, 1878-1879 Принос за неговия обхват и резултати, за вътрешните и външнополитическите условия, при които избухва, протича и стихва.  (Издателство на Българската Академия на науките. София, 1979) (Doyno Doynov. Kresna–Razlog uprising 1878-1879: On its scope and results, internal and external political circumstances in which it starts, continues, and ends. Sofia. 1979. Published by the Bulgarian Academy of Sciences)
 BULGARIAN ACADEMY OF SCIENCES Institute of History Bulgarian Language Institute - MACEDONIA, DOCUMENTS AND MATERIALS. Sofia 1978 
 БАЛКАНСКИТЕ ДЪРЖАВИ И МАКЕДОНСКИЯТ ВЪПРОС - Антони Гиза.(превод от полски - Димитър Димитров, Македонски Научен Институт, София, 2001) 

Bulgarian rebellions
Rebellions against the Ottoman Empire
1878 in Bulgaria
1879 in Bulgaria
Conflicts in 1878
Conflicts in 1879
19th-century rebellions
Macedonia under the Ottoman Empire
1878 in the Ottoman Empire
Great Eastern Crisis
Macedonian Question